The 2007 Taça de Angola was the 26th edition of the Taça de Angola, the second most important and the top knock-out football club competition following the Girabola. 

The winner qualified to the 2008 CAF Confederation Cup.

Stadiums and locations

Championship bracket

Round of 16

Quarter-finals

Semi-finals

Final

See also
 2007 Girabola
 2008 Angola Super Cup
 2008 CAF Confederation Cup
 Primeiro de Maio players
 Benfica de Luanda players

External links
 profile at rsssf.com
 profile at girabola.com

References

Angola Cup
2007 in Angolan football
Angola